"If Love Is the Law" is a song by English rock band Noel Gallagher's High Flying Birds. Written by frontman Noel Gallagher, it was released on 12" limited edition picture disc & coloured vinyl on 21 September 2018 as the fourth and final single from the band's third studio album Who Built the Moon? (2017).

Music video
The official video for "If Love Is the Law", directed by Mike Brue. The video is the fifth chapter of the seven part film Stranded on the Earth and hones in on the end of a young couple's relationship in the American Southwest. The video doubles as a standalone music video as well as a trailer for Stranded on the Earth. "If Love Is the Law" was released on the band's Vevo account on 19 July 2018.

Track listing
12"

Digital

Charts

References

2017 songs
Noel Gallagher's High Flying Birds songs
Songs written by Noel Gallagher